Samuel P. Kenyon (1846 – June 14, 1884) was an American soldier who fought in the American Civil War. Kenyon received his country's highest award for bravery during combat, the Medal of Honor. Kenyon's medal was won for his capturing a flag at the Battle of Sailor's Creek, Virginia on April 6, 1865 He was honored with the award on May 3, 1865.

Kenyon was born in Ira, New York, and joined the 24th New York Cavalry from Augusta, New York in February 1864. He was transferred to the 1st New York Provisional Cavalry in June 1865, and mustered out with this regiment the following month. Kenyon was buried at Lakeview Cemetery in Richfield Springs, New York.

Medal of Honor citation

See also
List of American Civil War Medal of Honor recipients: G–L

References

1846 births
1884 deaths
Date of birth unknown
American Civil War recipients of the Medal of Honor
Burials in New York (state)
People from Cayuga County, New York
People of New York (state) in the American Civil War
Union Army soldiers
United States Army Medal of Honor recipients